Atlético Peruano was a Peruvian football club, located in the district of Rímac, Lima. The club was founded with the name of club Atlético Peruano Nr. 1 and played in the first edition of the Liga Peruana de Football in 1912.

Honours
Peruvian Primera División:
 Runner-up: 1915

División Intermedia:
Runner-up (1): 1936

See also
List of football clubs in Peru
Peruvian football league system

References

Football clubs in Lima